Aeria is a genus of clearwing (ithomiine) butterflies named by Jacob Hübner in 1816. They are in the brush-footed butterfly family, Nymphalidae.

Species
Arranged alphabetically:
Aeria elara (Hewitson, 1855)
Aeria eurimedia (Cramer, [1777])
Aeria olena Weymer, 1875

References

Ithomiini
Nymphalidae of South America
Nymphalidae genera
Taxa named by Jacob Hübner